Trap was one of the thirteen shooting events at the 1992 Summer Olympics. It was the last Olympic trap competition open to both men and women. It was held from 31 July to 2 August 1992 at the Mollet del Vallès. There were 54 competitors from 36 nations, with each nation having up to 3 shooters. The competition consisted of a qualification round of 150 targets, a semifinal of 50 targets for the top 24 competitors, and a final of 25 targets for the top six. Petr Hrdlička and Kazumi Watanabe both hit 219 of the 225 targets, with Hrdlička winning the gold medal shoot-off. One hit behind, another shoot-off determined the bronze medalist, with Marco Venturini defeating Jörg Damme. Hrdlička's victory was the first gold medal for Czechoslovakia in the trap, shortly after the nation won its first medal in the event (silver in 1988). Watanabe's silver was Japan's first medal in the trap. Venturini put Italy back on the podium after a one-Games absence in 1988 broke a four-Games medal streak in the event.

Background
This was the 16th appearance of the men's ISSF Olympic trap event. The event was held at every Summer Olympics from 1896 to 1924 (except 1904, when no shooting events were held) and from 1952 to 2016. As with most shooting events, it was nominally open to women from 1968 to 1980; the trap remained open to women through 1992. Very few women participated these years. The event returned to being men-only for 1996, though the new double trap had separate events for men and women that year. In 2000, a separate women's event was added and it has been contested at every Games since. There was also a men's team trap event held four times from 1908 to 1924.

Three of the 6 finalists from the 1988 Games returned: bronze medalist Frans Peeters of Belgium, fourth-place finisher Francisco Boza of Peru, and sixth-place finisher Kazumi Watanabe of Japan. Favourites in the event included Marco Venturini of Italy (World Champion in 1989 and 1991) and Jörg Damme of Germany (World Champion in 1990). Other World Championship medalists competing were Daniele Cioni of Italy (silver in 1990) and Michael Diamond of Australia (silver in 1991).

Croatia, Estonia, Kuwait, and the Netherlands Antilles each made their debut in the event; twelve former Soviet republics competed together as the Unified Team. Great Britain made its 15th appearance, most among nations, having missed only the boycotted 1980 Moscow Games.

Competition format
The competition used the three-round, 225-target total format introduced in 1988. The qualification round consisted of six series of 25 shots (150 total). The top 24 shooters advanced to the semifinal. The semifinal featured an additional two series of 25 shots (50 total for the semifinal), with the score added to the qualification round score for a 200-target semifinal total. The top 6 shooters at that point moved on to the final. One additional series of 25 targets was used for the final, with a total score out of 225. Shoot-offs were used as necessary to break ties for medals.

Records
Prior to this competition, the existing world and Olympic records were as follows.

No new world or Olympic records were set during the competition.

Schedule
After the 1988 Games used a one-day format, the 1992 competition returned to a three-day event.

All times are Central European Summer Time (UTC+2)

Results

Qualifying round

Semifinal

Final

References

Sources

Shooting at the 1992 Summer Olympics
1992 Trap
Trap at the Olympics